Carciano de Jesus Acácio, known as just Carciano, is a Brazilian football defender.

1981 births
Living people
Brazilian footballers
Villa Nova Atlético Clube players
Ceará Sporting Club players
Brazilian expatriate footballers
C.F. Os Belenenses players
Primeira Liga players
Expatriate footballers in Portugal
Brazilian expatriate sportspeople in Portugal
Association football defenders
Sportspeople from Salvador, Bahia